Ohangai is a locality in South Taranaki, New Zealand. It is approximately 10 km east of Hawera and 6 km north of Mokoia

The New Zealand Ministry for Culture and Heritage gives a translation of "opposite place" for Ōhāngai.

Demographics

There were 207 households. There were 270 males and 267 females, giving a sex ratio of 1.01 males per female. The median age was 38.8 years (compared with 37.4 years nationally), with 117 people (21.8%) aged under 15 years, 87 (16.2%) aged 15 to 29, 279 (52.0%) aged 30 to 64, and 54 (10.1%) aged 65 or older.

Ethnicities were 89.4% European/Pākehā, 17.9% Māori, 0.6% Pacific peoples, 1.1% Asian, and 1.1% other ethnicities (totals add to more than 100% since people could identify with multiple ethnicities).

The proportion of people born overseas was 8.4%, compared with 27.1% nationally.

Although some people objected to giving their religion, 46.9% had no religion, 38.0% were Christian and 2.2% had other religions.

Of those at least 15 years old, 48 (11.4%) people had a bachelor or higher degree, and 105 (25.0%) people had no formal qualifications. The median income was $38,100, compared with $31,800 nationally. The employment status of those at least 15 was that 252 (60.0%) people were employed full-time, 78 (18.6%) were part-time, and 9 (2.1%) were unemployed.

Marae

The local Meremere Marae and Tataurangi meeting house are affiliated with the Ngāti Ruanui hapū of Ngā Ariki, Ngāti Hine and Tūwhakaehu.

In October 2020, the Government committed $1,479,479 from the Provincial Growth Fund to renovate Meremere Marae, Ketemarae Pā, Pariroa Marae and Taiporohēnui Marae, creating 35 jobs.

Education

Ohangai School was a coeducational contributing primary (years 1-6) school, which celebrated its centennial in 2006. It closed in 2012.

References

Populated places in Taranaki
South Taranaki District